Hans Pedersen (5 November 1887 in Højelse, Køge Municipality, Sjælland, Denmark – 22 September 1943 in Kimmerslev, Køge Municipality) was a Danish gymnast who competed in the 1906 Intercalated Games and the 1912 and 1920 Summer Olympics.

At the 1906 Intercalated Games in Athens, he was a member of the Danish team which won the silver medal in the Swedish gymnastics system event.

He was also part of the Danish men's teams which won two silver medals in the Swedish gymnastics system event at Stockholm in 1912 as well as at Antwerp in 1920. He was married to Kamilla Larsen from Storeskov in Denmark.

References

External links
 

1887 births
1943 deaths
Danish male artistic gymnasts
Olympic gymnasts of Denmark
Gymnasts at the 1906 Intercalated Games
Gymnasts at the 1912 Summer Olympics
Gymnasts at the 1920 Summer Olympics
Olympic silver medalists for Denmark
People from Køge Municipality
Olympic medalists in gymnastics
Medalists at the 1920 Summer Olympics
Medalists at the 1912 Summer Olympics
Medalists at the 1906 Intercalated Games
Sportspeople from Region Zealand